Bernard Scott (born February 10, 1984) is a former American football running back. He was drafted by the Cincinnati Bengals in the sixth round of the 2009 NFL Draft. He played college football at Abilene Christian. His brother Daryl Richardson is also a former NFL running back.

Early years
A native of Vernon, Texas, Scott had a troubled past. A Class 3A first-team all-state selection as a high school junior in 2001, Scott was kicked off his high school team at Vernon High School because of an off-campus fight after the season. He was not eligible for his senior year, and finally graduated from Wichita Falls High School in 2003.

College career
He went on to attend Central Arkansas University, where he earned Gulf South Conference Freshman of the Year honors in 2004, but was eventually dismissed from the football team for hitting a coach, along with a few other issues. Scott transferred to Blinn College, where he was a first-team NJCAA All-America after leading the Buccaneers to a 12-0 season and the NJCAA national championship. Scott averaged 154.4 rushing yards per game, and he finished his only junior college season with a junior college-best 1,892 yards and 27 touchdowns. He was also first-team all Southwestern Junior College Football Conference.

Rated a three-star recruit by Rivals.com, Scott drew some interest by Arkansas and Fresno State, but eventually enrolled at Abilene Christian University in 2007. He had finished runner-up in the voting for the 2007 Harlon Hill Trophy to Danny Woodhead. In that year, Scott broke the league's single-season rushing record with 2,165 yards and set a pair of NCAA Division II single-season records with 39 total touchdowns and 234 points scored. In 2008, Scott won the Harlon Hill Trophy in a landslide, getting the third-highest vote total in the 23-year history of the trophy.

Professional career

2009 NFL Draft
Scott's NFL prospects were tarnished by his off-the-field issues. Besides his aforementioned trouble in high school and junior college, he has also been arrested for some traffic-related misdemeanors, and was put on an 18-month probation for failing to identify himself during a traffic stop in Abilene in the spring of 2007.  However, he was drafted by the Cincinnati Bengals in the 2009 NFL Draft.

Cincinnati Bengals
Following training camp, Scott made the active roster as a kick returner and as a backup to running back Cedric Benson. On November 15, 2009, Scott returned a kickoff 96 yards for a touchdown against the Pittsburgh Steelers, which earned him AFC Special Teams Player of the Week honors.

In his first career start, in week 11 against the Oakland Raiders, Scott rushed for 119 yards, including a 61-yard run that was the longest by a Bengal since Corey Dillon's 67-yard rush at Cleveland on September 15, 2002.

Baltimore Ravens
Scott signed with the Baltimore Ravens on October 28, 2013. On December 7, 2013, the Ravens released Scott. On December 10, after a season-ending injury to Brandon Stokley, Scott re-signed with the Ravens.

Toronto Argonauts
On March 3, 2015, Scott signed with the Toronto Argonauts of the Canadian Football League. He retired in May 2015.

References

External links
Toronto Argonauts bio
Official bio at Cincinnati Bengals
Official bio at Abilene Christian

1984 births
Living people
People from Vernon, Texas
Players of American football from Texas
Wichita Falls High School alumni
African-American players of American football
American football running backs
Canadian football running backs
American players of Canadian football
Abilene Christian Wildcats football players
Blinn Buccaneers football players
Central Arkansas Bears football players
Cincinnati Bengals players
Baltimore Ravens players
Toronto Argonauts players
21st-century African-American sportspeople
20th-century African-American people